Pandoridae is a taxonomic family of small saltwater clams, marine bivalves in the order Anomalodesmata.

Genera and species
Genera and species within the family Pandoridae include:
 Clidiophora Carpenter, 1864
 Coania Valentich-Scott & Skoglund, 2010
 Foveadens Dall, 1915
 Frenamya Iredale, 1930
 Pandora Chemnitz, 1795

References

 Bieler, R.; Carter, J. G.; Coan, E. V. (2010). Classification of Bivalve families. Pp. 113-133, in: Bouchet P. & Rocroi J.-P. (2010), Nomenclator of Bivalve Families. Malacologia. 52(2): 1-184
 Coan, E. V.; Valentich-Scott, P. (2012). Bivalve seashells of tropical West America. Marine bivalve mollusks from Baja California to northern Peru. 2 vols, 1258 pp.

 
Bivalve families
Taxa named by Constantine Samuel Rafinesque